{{Under construction}}

Jambulat Sarsenov (Jambolat Jaqiiaūly Särsenov; born November 21, 1961 in the city of Shymkent, South-Kazakhstan region) is a Kazakh businessperson.

Vice President of the World Petroleum Council (WPC).

Chairman of the Committee of the Pharmaceutical and Medical Industry and Health Care Services of the Presidium National Chamber of Entrepreneurs of the Republic of Kazakhstan “Atameken”.

Honorary Consul of Hungary in the Republic of Kazakhstan, Co-Chair of the Kazakh-Hungarian Business Council.

President of the Kazakhstan Federation of Sports Medicine.

Biography 
In 1978, he graduated from the secondary school №1 in Shymkent, South Kazakhstan region. In 1985, he graduated from the I.I. Mechnikov St.-Petersburg State Medical Academy with a degree in health care organization and management; completed extramural studies at the T. Ryskulov Kazakh Institute of Economics majoring in public administration; graduated from the Diplomatic Academy of the Eurasian National University in Astana specializing in international relations; and completed the Eni “Master in Petroleum Business” Program.

Between 2004-2005 he was the General Director of “KazRosGaz” JSC; from June to December 2005 – Chief of Staff in NC KazMunayGas JSC; from December 2005 – General Director of the Union of Legal Entities "Kazakhstan Association of Oil, Gas and Energy Sector Organizations KAZENERGY. From November 2012 to December 2021 — Vice Chairman of the Union of Legal Entities “Kazakhstan Association of Oil, Gas and Energy Sector Organizations KAZENERGY.

In 2013-2014, he was Vice Chairman of the Energy Charter Conference. In 2015, he was appointed as Special Envoy of the Energy Charter Secretary General for a fixed term of two years, and in 2017 he was re-appointed to this post.

In July 2017, he was elected Vice President for Marketing and Member of the Executive Committee of the World Petroleum Council (WPC). This decision was made within the framework of the 22nd World Petroleum Congress in Istanbul, the Republic of Turkey.

Professional activity 
As a Member of the WPC Executive Committee, he takes part in the development of integration and energy dialogue between Kazakhstan and the world energy community.

Sarsenov took part in the development of boxing in Kazakhstan and led the development of the new Charter and structure of the Kazakhstan Boxing Federation to bring it to conformity with the AIBA requirements (2008).

As Vice President for International Relations of the Kazakhstan Boxing Federation, he was the first in the AIBA history who signed the WSB franchise agreement between the WSB LLC and the Kazakhstan Boxing Federation on January 27, 2010 in Xiamen, China.

As Co-Chairman of the Kazakh-Hungarian Business Council (KHBC), which regularly conducts special events for the business circles of both countries, he is involved in the development of the trade and economic cooperation. In December 2015, he was appointed Honorary Consul of Hungary in the Republic of Kazakhstan and later was awarded the Hungarian Order of Merit.

Being a founder of MEDIKER medical network, he participates in the development of private medicine in Kazakhstan. The company’s subsidiary “Mediker Industrial Medicine” that provides medical services at production facilities became a winner of the “Altyn Sapa” Award of the President of the Republic of Kazakhstan, which was one of the most important events in the company’s activity. The company also became an official partner and exclusive provider of medical services at the international specialized exhibition EXPO 2017 in Astana.

As a result of the meeting of the Kazakhstan Federation of Sports Medicine, which was held on April 24, 2018, Sarsenov was appointed President of the Federation.

He speaks Kazakh, Russian and English.

Awards 

 Order of Kurmet (2010)
 Order of Parasat (2015)
 Order of Merit of the Republic of Hungary (2017)
 Medal: 10th Anniversary of the Constitution of the Republic of Kazakhstan (2005)
 Medal: 10th Anniversary of Astana (2008)
 1st Degree Medal Atameken (2009)
 Medal: 20th Anniversary of Independence of the Republic of Kazakhstan (2011)
 Medal: 10th Anniversary of KAZENERGY (2015)
 Medal: 25th Anniversary of Independence of the Republic of Kazakhstan (2016)

References 

1961 births
Living people
People from Shymkent
Kazakhstani politicians
Recipients of the Order of Kurmet